Placosoma cipoense, Cunha's Brazilian lizard , is a species of lizard in the family Gymnophthalmidae. It is endemic to Brazil.

References

Placosoma (lizard)
Reptiles of Brazil
Endemic fauna of Brazil
Reptiles described in 1966
Taxa named by Osvaldo Rodrigues da Cunha